John Westcott (June 16, 1807 – December 31, 1888) was an American surveyor and politician from the state of Florida. Westcott served as the surveyor general of Florida and the first president of the Florida Coast Line Canal and Transportation Company.

Early life and education 
Westcott was born in Bridgeton, New Jersey on June 16, 1807. His father, James Westcott Sr., was formerly a newspaper publisher in Washington, D.C. before moving to New Jersey to enter local politics. Westcott's grandfather was a captain in the American Revolutionary War. In 1823, Westcott's father, through his association with the Delaware and Raritan Canal Company, became friends with Samuel L. Southard, one of New Jersey's United States senators. Southard sponsored Westcott for admission into West Point, and Westcott enlisted in the academy on July 1, 1823. However, Westcott, who was not very athletic, left the academy on November 15, 1823, citing the physical challenges. Westcott instead began studying medicine at the University of Pennsylvania in Philadelphia, primarily focusing on the treatment of yellow fever and dysentery.

Early career

Seminole Wars

Second Seminole War 
In 1838, Westcott's brother, James Westcott Jr., who was a prominent local politician in the Florida Territory, requested that his brother move to the territory in order to aid the U.S. Army during the Second Seminole War. Yellow fever was prevalent in Florida's swamps, and there weren't many trained doctors who knew how to treat the disease in the territory. Westcott moved to Florida in 1838, settling in Madison County, Florida. Westcott enlisted in the U.S. Army in 1840, serving as a surgeon in the Florida Mounted Volunteers under the command of Colonel William Bailey.

Due to his training at West Point, Westcott was well regarded among the officers during the war, and was frequently consulted on matters of strategy. Westcott saved his regiment from disaster multiple times, most notably preventing them from marching into a Seminole ambush in the San Pedro Swamp.

After the end of the Second Seminole War, Westcott settled into a simple life as one of Madison County's prominent citizens, founding the county's Masonic Lodge and becoming the county postmaster, as well as continuing to practice medicine. When Florida was admitted to the Union in 1845, Westcott was elected to the first Florida House of Representatives, and was one of the pioneers of Florida's educational system. He only served one term. In 1847, Westcott via his newly acquired friendship with Samuel J. Perry, another prominent citizen in Madison County and a deputy surveyor with the General Land Office, was himself granted a commission as a deputy surveyor. Westcott meticulously mapped Florida's Green Swamp, a task previously deemed impossible. Westcott also began working closely with the army after coming to the conclusion that the swamps, though inhospitable for human settlement, were the perfect hiding spots for Seminole war camps.

Third Seminole War 
In 1853, President Millard Fillmore, under pressure from many politicians to deal with the Seminoles, appointed Westcott as the surveyor general of Florida. In this position, Westcott would have full control over the mapping of Florida, discovering the locations of possible Seminole camps and figuring out key positions to build army forts.

Despite popular opinion calling for the complete and forcible extermination of the Seminoles, Westcott believed a more peaceful solution was possible. With the help of the army, Westcott began destroying Seminole food sources and forward camps, forcing the tribe into a limited area of operation around the Everglades. In 1854, James E. Broome, the governor of Florida, shared Westcott's belief that a peaceful resolution was possible, and enlisted the aid of the Oklahoma Seminoles to try to persuade their kinsman to surrender. However, the Florida Seminoles, led by Chief Billy Bowlegs, refused to surrender.

As a result of pressure from many politicians, the U.S. Secretary of War, Jefferson Davis, outranking Westcott and Broome, commanded the army to begin aggressive reconnaissance of the Everglades in an attempt to provoke a Seminole response. Sure enough, on December 20, 1855, an army patrol led by Lieutenant George Lucas Hartsuff was attacked by a Seminole war band led by Bowlegs himself near Fort Myers, giving the United States the justification to declare the Third Seminole War. Neither Westcott nor any of his surveyors played an active role in the war. With the exception of a small band that remained in hiding deep in the Big Cypress Swamp, the Seminoles were entirely defeated by 1858. Westcott left his position as surveyor general the same year.

Political aspirations 
Westcott was not particularly interested in politics, despite the prominent positions of his family and his friends. Westcott was a member of the Whig Party until it collapsed in 1856, and then became a Know Nothing. After the Know Nothings collapsed in 1858, Westcott became an Independent Democrat. It was under this party that Westcott would challenge the incumbent U.S. representative, George Sydney Hawkins. Westcott believed that the Florida Democratic Party was corrupt, and wanted to abolish the state's convention system for selecting party nominees, as well as support frontier settlers with offers of cheap land. Despite his extreme popularity in Florida's frontierlands of East Florida and South Florida, as well as the support of Florida's Democratic governor, Madison S. Perry, due to a lack of party support, Westcott's campaign was unable to make inroads into West Florida, and was crushed in the general election, only receiving 37% of the vote in a two-person race.

Later career and death 
At the outbreak of the American Civil War, both Westcott and his nephew James Westcott III enlisted as officers in the Confederate Army. While his nephew enlisted in the 1st Florida Infantry, which actively saw combat in some of the war's bloodiest battles, Westcott, due to his advanced age, instead enlisted into the 2nd Florida Infantry, and was placed in command of the defense of Tampa, defending the city during the Battle of Fort Brooke in 1863.

After the end of the war, Westcott settled in St. Augustine, Florida, serving as a private surveyor for the area.

Westcott served as one of Florida's delegates to the 1876 Democratic National Convention in St. Louis, Missouri, serving on the Committee on Resolutions. Westcott supported Governor Samuel J. Tilden of New York for president and Governor Thomas A. Hendricks of Indiana for vice president, both becoming the eventual nominees.

In 1878, Westcott was once again elected to the Florida House of Representative, this time representing St. Johns County. Like his previous stint, Westcott only served one term.

In 1881, at the behest of St. Augustine residents, the Florida Legislature created the Florida Coast Line Canal and Transportation Company, responsible for dredging and developing the area around the St. Johns River, and placed Westcott as its first president due to his knowledge of surveying. Westcott served in this position until his death on December 31, 1888.

See also 

 James Westcott

References 

1807 births
1888 deaths
Florida Democrats
Florida Whigs
Members of the Florida House of Representatives
University of Pennsylvania alumni
Perelman School of Medicine at the University of Pennsylvania alumni
Confederate States Army officers
Confederate States Army soldiers
19th-century American politicians
People of Florida in the American Civil War
People from Bridgeton, New Jersey
People from St. Augustine, Florida
People from Madison County, Florida
American surveyors
American people of the Seminole Wars
American transportation businesspeople
United States Army officers
United States Military Academy alumni
19th-century American businesspeople
Military personnel from New Jersey